"Might Get Loud" is a song performed by American contemporary worship band Elevation Worship featuring Chris Brown, Brandon Lake and Tiffany Hudson. The song was released as a single on August 20, 2021, as the lead single from Elevation Worship's tenth live album, Lion (2022). The song was written by Brandon Lake, Chris Brown, and Steven Furtick. Chris Brown and Steven Furtick handled the production of the single.

Background
Elevation Worship released "Might Get Loud" as a single on August 20, 2021, with Chris Brown, Brandon Lake, and Tiffany Hudson leading the song. The single marks the first release since Elevation Worship and Maverick City Music's collaborative album, Old Church Basement (2021). It also marks Lake's fifth appearance for Elevation Worship, having performed on the hit single "Graves into Gardens" and multiple songs on Old Church Basement.

Composition

Commercial performance
"Might Get Loud" debuted at No. 20 on the US Hot Christian Songs chart dated September 4, 2021, concurrently charting at No. 4 on the Christian Digital Song Sales chart.

Music video
The live music video of "Might Get Loud" was published on YouTube by Elevation Worship on August 20, 2021.

Track listing

Charts

Release history

References

External links
 

2021 singles
Elevation Worship songs
Brandon Lake songs
2021 songs
Songs written by Brandon Lake
Songs written by Steven Furtick